A gully is a small valley.

Gully or The Gully may also refer to:


Arts and entertainment
Gully (album), a 2003 album by Indian band Euphoria
Gully (film), a 2019 film
Gully Foyle, protagonist of the novel The Stars My Destination by Alfred Bester
A character in the Battle Chasers comic book series
Agent Gully, a character in the British web series Corner Shop Show

Places
Gully, Minnesota, a small city in the United States
Gully Township, Polk County, Minnesota
The Gully (Atlantic), an undersea canyon off the eastern coast of North America

People
Gully (surname)

Other uses
A storm drain
Gully, a fielding position in the sport of cricket; see slip
Gully, the mascot of Brighton & Hove Albion F.C.
"The Gully", nickname of a key ravine in the Moro River Campaign in Italy in World War II
The Gully, an internet magazine co-founded by Kelly Cogswell and Ana Simo

See also
Gully cricket, an informal form of cricket, played in South Asia
Gulley